Marginella lutea is a species of sea snail, a marine gastropod mollusk in the family Marginellidae, the margin snails.

Description

Distribution

References

 Cossignani T. (2006). Marginellidae & Cystiscidae of the World. L'Informatore Piceno. 408pp.

Marginellidae
Gastropods described in 1889